Bravetown is a 2015 American independent musical drama film written by Oscar Orlando Torres, and was directed by Daniel Duran in his directoral debut. The film stars Lucas Till, Josh Duhamel and Kherington Payne. The film was released in a limited release and through video on demand on May 8, 2015, by Entertainment One.

Plot
Josh is a musically-talented DJ who, after an accidental overdose, goes to live with his estranged father in North Dakota. His journey to make amends with his family, past friends and hometown opens him up to emotional encounters that reveal more than he was expecting.

Cast
 Lucas Till as Josh Harvest
 Kherington Payne as Mary Johnson
 Josh Duhamel as Alexander Weller
 Jae Head as Tony
 Sharlene Taulé as Angie
 Tom Everett Scott as Jim
 Maria Bello as Martha
 Laura Dern as Annie

Production
During production of the film, it was originally titled Strings.

Principal photography on the film commenced on June 9, 2013, in Winnipeg, then Selkirk, Manitoba.

Release
The film was released in a limited release and through video on demand on May 8, 2015, by Entertainment One.

References

External links
 
 

Films shot in Winnipeg
Films set in North Dakota
2015 films
2015 drama films
American drama films
2015 directorial debut films
2010s English-language films
2010s American films